The Union for Development is a political party in the Chinese Special Administrative Region of Macau.

In the 2005 legislative election, the party won 13.3 percent of the popular vote and 2 of the 12 popularly elected seats.

Elected members
Tong Chi Kin, 1992–2001
Fernando Chui, 1992–1996
Leong Iok Wa, 2001–2005
Kwan Tsui Hang, 2005–present
Lee Chong Cheng, 2009–2013

See also
Macau Federation of Trade Unions, parent party

References

Political parties in Macau